Henry Fairfax may refer to:

 Henry Fairfax (academic) (1588–1665), English priest and academic
 Henry Fairfax, 4th Lord Fairfax of Cameron (1631–1688), Scottish nobleman, peer, and politician
 Henry Fairfax (priest) (1634–1702), English Dean of Norwich and academic
 Henry Fairfax (Royal Navy officer) (1837–1900), British admiral
Sir Henry Fairfax, 1st Baronet (1790–1860), of the Cameron-Ramsay-Fairfax-Lucy baronets
Sir Henry William Cameron-Ramsay-Fairfax-Lucy, 3rd Baronet (1870–1944), of the Cameron-Ramsay-Fairfax-Lucy baronets
Sir Henry Montgomerie Cameron-Ramsay-Fairfax-Lucy, 4th Baronet (1896–1965), of the Cameron-Ramsay-Fairfax-Lucy baronets

See also
Fairfax (disambiguation)